Barbara Fairchild (born November 12, 1950) is an American country and gospel singer, who is best known for her hit 1973 country song "Teddy Bear Song" and other country hits.

Biography

Early life and beginnings in Nashville
She was born in Knobel, Arkansas, United States. Fairchild started her career at a young age singing country music. She cut her first single at 15 years old. In 1963, she moved to St. Louis, Missouri, and by 1965, she was a regular on a local TV show and recorded for a local label, Norman Records, but none of her singles released were much more than regional hits.

In 1968, after high school graduation, she decided to follow her dream and moved to Nashville. She briefly signed with Kapp Records with no success. She also recorded briefly for MCA Records. After this, she met producer Billy Sherrill, who had discovered Tammy Wynette. He listened to Fairchild's songs and decided that she was ready for a major record deal, and he signed her with Columbia Records in 1969. Her first single in 1969, "Love Is A Gentle Thing", was a minor hit as was her next single, "A Woman's Hand". In 1970, she scored her first Top 40 hit with "A Girl Who'll Satisfy Her Man". Between 1970 and 1972, Fairchild scored four more Top 40 hits, the biggest of these being "Love's Old Song" and "Thanks For The Mem'ries".

The success of "Teddy Bear Song"
1973 would turn out to be the breakthrough year for Fairchild as she released the biggest hit of her career with "Teddy Bear Song". It became a number 1 hit on the country charts, and reached the pop charts as well, peaking at No. 32. It was nominated for a Grammy Award that year. "Teddy Bear Song" spent two weeks at the No. 1 spot. She followed up "Teddy Bear Song" that year with another hit, "Kid Stuff," which reached number 2 on the country chart, and made the Billboard Hot 100 at No. 95. In 1974, she scored another Top 10 with the song "Baby Doll." Between 1974 and 1977, she had several other successes, including "Standing In Your Line," "Little Girl Feelin'," "Mississippi," "Cheatin' Is," and "Let Me Love You Once Before You Go."

Later career and life
She turned her attention to Gospel music, where she has recorded both solo and with Connie Smith and Sharon White on the album, Love Never Fails. She now lives in Branson, Missouri, with her husband Roy Morris, who is also a singer-songwriter.

Discography

Awards and honors
Inducted into the Christian Music Hall of Fame in 2009.
Nominated for Christian Country Female Vocalist of the Year for a Visionary Award by the Christian Music Hall of Fame.

References

External links

  

1950 births
Living people
American country singer-songwriters
American women country singers
People from Clay County, Arkansas
People from Branson, Missouri
American gospel singers
Singer-songwriters from Missouri
Singer-songwriters from Arkansas
Country musicians from Missouri
Country musicians from Arkansas
21st-century American women